Andrés Prieto may refer to:

 Andrés Prieto (footballer, born 1928), Chilean footballer
 Andrés Prieto (footballer, born 1993), Spanish footballer